KHIC (98.5 FM, "Big 98.5") is a commercial Top 40/CHR radio station licensed to Klamath Falls, Oregon, United States.  The station is currently owned by Basin Mediactive, LLC.

History
The station signed on the air on April 22, 2014. According to General Manager Rob Siems, "We decided to go with a station that plays today’s hit music, because we felt there wasn’t any other station filling that niche in the Klamath Basin." The station serves as an affiliate for "On Air With Ryan Seacrest" and "Zach Sang and the Gang."

The station airs a topical morning show "The Big Morning Show with Scott Hoffman and Nicky Robinson. Another local DJ, Cooper Roberts who is the Sports Director of Basin Mediactive, LLC. hosts the BIG Afternoon Show.

References

External links

HIC
Klamath Falls, Oregon
Contemporary hit radio stations in the United States